The 1828 United States presidential election in Connecticut took place between October 31 and December 2, 1828, as part of the 1828 United States presidential election. Voters chose eight representatives, or electors to the Electoral College, who voted for President and Vice President.

Connecticut voted for the National Republican candidate, John Quincy Adams, over the Democratic candidate, Andrew Jackson. Adams won Connecticut by a margin of 48.41%.

With 71.36% of the popular vote, Connecticut would prove to be Adams' fourth strongest state in the 1828 election after Rhode Island, Massachusetts and Vermont.

Results

See also
 United States presidential elections in Connecticut

References

Connecticut
1828
1828 Connecticut elections